Menaker is a surname of European Jewish origin; 
it is an "occupational surname" relating to Nikkur, sometimes part of the kashering process.
Notable people with the surname include:

Daniel Menaker (1941–2020), American writer
Michael Menaker (1934–2021), American biologist
Robert Menaker (1904–1988), American Soviet spy
Andrei Mironov (1941–1987), born Andrei Menaker, Soviet/Russian actor
Will Menaker, host of the American leftist podcast Chapo Trap House; son of Daniel Menaker and grandson of Robert Menaker.